Chah Reza or Chah-e Reza may refer to:

Chah Reza, Lorestan